Dewanishiki Tadao (July 15, 1925 – January 1, 2005) was a sumo wrestler from Tokyo, Japan. His highest rank was sekiwake. He won ten kinboshi or gold stars for defeating yokozuna during his long top division career, which only four wrestlers have bettered. He also won four special prizes. After his retirement he was a coach at Dewanoumi stable.

Career 

He debuted in May 1940 and won his first yusho in sandanme in January 1944. He left sumo for portions of 1944 and 1945 but returned and saw success in jūryō, leading to a 9-1 record in June 1947 to capture the jūryō title. He was then promoted to makuuchi, earning a share of the jun-yūshō (runner-up) in only his first tournament in makuuchi with a 9-2 record. He continued on and earned his first kinboshi in October 1949, defeating yokozuna Maedayama Eigorō. In May 1950, he achieved the rank of komusubi. He achieved his highest career rank of sekiwake in May 1956, but had a 3-9-3 record which dropped him back to maegashira level. He achieved the rank of sekiwake twice more in January 1960 and September 1962, but again dropped down to the maegashira ranks,  both times after a single tournament. He won his second Outstanding Performance Prize in 1961, 14 years after his first in 1947. He earned his tenth and final kinboshi in March 1963, defeating yokozuna Taihō Kōki on Day 4 of the tournament. He then retired in September 1964 after a 6-9 make-koshi record. As of 2017 only Akinoshima (16), Takamiyama and Tochinonada (12), and Tosanoumi (11) have earned more career kinboshi.

Retirement from sumo
He remained in sumo as an elder of the Japan Sumo Association, working as a coach at Dewanoumi stable under the name Tagonoura Oyakata. He reached the mandatory retirement age of 65 in 1990. He died in 2005 at the age of 79.

Pre-modern record

Only two tournaments were held a year through much of the 1940s. The New Year tournament began and the Spring tournament returned to Osaka tournament in 1953.

Modern top division record
Since the addition of the Kyushu tournament in 1957 and the Nagoya tournament in 1958, the yearly schedule has remained unchanged.

See also
List of sumo record holders
List of sumo tournament second division champions
Glossary of sumo terms
List of past sumo wrestlers
List of sekiwake

References 

1925 births
2005 deaths
Japanese sumo wrestlers
Sumo people from Tokyo
Sekiwake